The Minimum Wage Board is a Bangladesh government regulatory agency under the Ministry of Labour and Employment responsible for recommending changes to the minimum wage, which varies by industry, to the government.

History
Minimum Wage Board was established in 1959 by the Government of Pakistan based on the International Labour Organization conference in 1928. The board is responsible for establishing the minimum wage for all industries including the Textile industry in Bangladesh. According to Bangladesh labor law, minimum wages must be revised every five years.

References

1959 establishments in East Pakistan
Organisations based in Dhaka
Government agencies of Bangladesh
Minimum wage
Labor relations organizations
Labour in Bangladesh
Ministry of Labour and Employment (Bangladesh)